Dar Salam is an arrondissement of Salemata in Kédougou Region in Senegal.

References 

Arrondissements of Senegal